António Pedro de Brito Lopes (born 23 July 1979), commonly known as Toni, is a Portuguese professional footballer who plays as a right-back.

After starting out professionally at Farense, he went on to represent Benfica and Beira Mar in the Primeira Liga, signing with the former in 2002. He also competed in Switzerland, Spain and Cyprus, spending eight seasons in the latter nation, mostly with Apollon Limassol.

Club career
Born in Setúbal, Toni grew up in the neighbourhood of Bela Vista and started playing football at local Clube Desportivo Pelezinhos. He signed for neighbouring Vitória F.C. at the age of 15, where he finished his formation. His beginnings as a senior were spent with Lusitano G.C. in the fourth level, which he helped finish fourth in his first season and second in the following, with the subsequent promotion in the latter case.

In July 2000, Toni moved to the Primeira Liga and joined S.C. Farense. He made his debut in the competition on 29 October of that year, coming on as a second-half substitute and assisting for the second goal in a 2–1 away win against C.F. Estrela da Amadora. His performances soon attracted interest from S.C. Braga and Sevilla FC, and he was also linked with Southampton, Paris Saint-Germain F.C. and West Ham United towards the start and during the off-season, but ultimately signed with S.L. Benfica on a reported free deal.

However, it was soon discovered that Toni had signed with an investment firm, Premier Holding owned by Mike Walsh. They retained his international certificate and did not allowed him to play for Benfica until they received 650 thousand dollars. Only in January 2002, after FIFA intervened, was he allowed to play, first in the reserve team and then in the main squad, making his first and only appearance for the latter on the last matchday of the campaign and being sent off in the last minutes of a 2–3 away loss against C.S. Marítimo.

In July 2002, both Toni and Diogo Luís joined fellow league club S.C. Beira-Mar as Cristiano Roland moved in the opposite direction. He was regularly used as a starter in his first season but, in 2003–04, he appeared much more sparingly after losing his place to Pedro Ribeiro.

In the 2004 summer, aged 25, Toni moved abroad where he would remain until his retirement. His first stop was Servette FC in the Swiss Super League, and the second Zamora CF of the Spanish Segunda División B.

From 2007–08 onwards, Toni competed in the Cypriot First Division, where he appeared for Ethnikos Achna FC, Apollon Limassol, AEK Larnaca F.C. and Ermis Aradippou. With the second side, he won the 2012–13 Cypriot Cup.

International career
Toni represented the Portugal national team three times, gaining two caps for the under-21s and one for the B-side. All his appearances were friendlies, against Norway, Belarus and United States.

Career statistics

References

External links

1979 births
Living people
Sportspeople from Setúbal
Portuguese footballers
Association football defenders
Primeira Liga players
Segunda Divisão players
Lusitano G.C. players
S.C. Farense players
S.L. Benfica B players
S.L. Benfica footballers
S.C. Beira-Mar players
Swiss Super League players
Servette FC players
Segunda División B players
Zamora CF footballers
Cypriot First Division players
Ethnikos Achna FC players
Apollon Limassol FC players
AEK Larnaca FC players
Ermis Aradippou FC players
Portugal under-21 international footballers
Portuguese expatriate footballers
Expatriate footballers in Switzerland
Expatriate footballers in Spain
Expatriate footballers in Cyprus
Portuguese expatriate sportspeople in Switzerland
Portuguese expatriate sportspeople in Spain
Portuguese expatriate sportspeople in Cyprus
Portugal B international footballers